The 1976 Sicilian regional election took place on 20 June 1976.

Christian Democracy was by far the largest party, largely ahead of the Italian Communist Party. During the legislature the Christian Democrats governed the Region in coalition with some centre-left parties: the Italian Socialist Party, the Italian Democratic Socialist Party and the Italian Republican Party.

Results

Sources: Istituto Cattaneo and Sicilian Regional Assembly

References

Elections in Sicily
1976 elections in Italy
June 1976 events in Europe